Racquetball (Spanish: Racquetbol), for the 2013 Bolivarian Games, took place from 18 November to 24 November 2013.

Medal table

Medalists

References

Events at the 2013 Bolivarian Games
2013 Bolivarian Games
2013 in racquetball